Kohl Horton (born 4 May 2004) is a Cook Island canoeist. He competed in the men's K-1 1000 metres event at the 2020 Summer Olympics.

References

External links
 

2004 births
Living people
Cook Island male canoeists
Olympic canoeists of the Cook Islands
Canoeists at the 2020 Summer Olympics
Place of birth missing (living people)